2NUR is an Australian radio station, licensed to, and serving Newcastle and its surrounds. It is a community radio station, licensed to the University of Newcastle. It operates at 103.7 megahertz on the FM band. Its callsign, 2NUR, stands for Newcastle University Radio, and the 2 is a standard prefix for radio stations in New South Wales.

On-Air Schedule

WEEKDAYS

 Breakfast with Todd Sergeant 6:00am to 9:00am
 Mornings with Mark Rorke 9:00am to Midday
 Drive with Kev Kellaway 4:00pm to 8:00pm

MONDAYS

 Gardening Talkback with Scott Sharpe Midday to 1:00pm
 Easy Listening with Greg Richard 1:00pm to 4:00pm
 The Dungeon 8:00pm to 10:00pm
 Easy Listening Overnight 10:00pm to 6:00am

TUESDAYS

 Health and Wellbeing with Peter Mullen Midday to 1:00pm
 Easy Listening with John Slaven 1:00pm to 4:00pm
 The Muster 8:00pm to 10:00pm
 Easy Listening Overnight 10:00pm to 6:00am

WEDNESDAYS

 Pet Chat Midday to 1:00pm
 Easy Listening with Greg Richard 1:00pm to 4:00pm
 Left of Centre 8:00pm to 9:00pm
 Classic Folk 9:00pm to 10:00pm
 Home Brew with Greg Richard 10:00pm to 11:00pm
 Easy Listening Overnight 11:00pm to 6:00am

THURSDAYS

 Thursday Finance with Steven Pritchard 12 noon to 1:00pm
 Business, the Law & You 1:00pm to 2:00pm
 Easy Listening with Jane Klein 2:00pm to 4:00pm
 All That Jazz with Symon James 8:00pm to 10:00pm
 Easy Listening Overnight 10:00pm to 6:00am

FRIDAYS

 Health Naturally with Denis Stewart 12 noon to 1:00pm
 Talking Travel with Sally Lucas 1:00pm to 2:00pm
 Easy Listening with Jane Klein 2:00pm to 4:00pm
 Blues Night 8:00pm to 11:00pm
 Affected 11:00pm to 3:00am
 Easy Listening Overnight 3:00am to 7:00am

SATURDAYS

 Saturday Morning with Greg Richard 7:00am to Midday
 12 O'Clock Rock with Tony Kavanagh Midday to 4:00pm
 Easy Listening 4:00pm to 6:00pm
 Party Mix 6:00pm to 6:00am

SUNDAYS

 Sunday Sunrise with John McGahen 6:00am to 12 noon
 Casey Kasem's American Top 40 12:00pm to 3:00pm
 Easy Listening 3:00pm to 4:00pm
 Sunday Afternoon Country 4:00pm to 6:00pm
 Polish w/ Basia & Tony 6:00pm to 7:00pm
 Macedonian 7:00pm to 8:00pm
 Tongan 8:00pm to 9:00pm
 Samoan 9:00pm to 10:00pm
 Brass Encounters 10:00pm to 11:00pm
 Easy Listening 11:00pm to 6:00am

References

External links
 

2NUR
Community radio stations in Australia
Student radio stations in Australia
University of Newcastle (Australia)